Irena Nawrocka (3 November 1917 – 24 November 2009) was a Polish fencer. She competed in the women's individual foil events at the 1948 and 1952 Summer Olympics. Nawrocka graduated from the Law School of the Jagiellonian University in 1945. She was a sister of Jan Nawrocki's, who was also an Olympic fencer.

World War II
Nawrocka's escape, along with her first cousin Halina Dobrowolska (during the war, Halina Korabiowska) and three other female Home Army messengers, during their forced march to Ozarow, is documented in The Zookeeper's Wife, Chapter 34. Nawrocka is buried at Bródno Cemetery in Warsaw.

References

External links
 

1917 births
2009 deaths
Polish female foil fencers
Olympic fencers of Poland
Fencers at the 1948 Summer Olympics
Fencers at the 1952 Summer Olympics
People from Rzeszów
Jagiellonian University alumni
Sportspeople from Podkarpackie Voivodeship
People from the Kingdom of Galicia and Lodomeria
Polish Austro-Hungarians
20th-century Polish women